"Fallin' for You" is the third single from Eva Avila's debut album, Somewhere Else. The song was produced by Adam Messinger with music by Jorge Corante and words and melody by Lindy Robbins and Carmen Reece. It was released for radio airplay on April 3 across Canada, and in the final 16 seconds of the track separated from the song, Avila sings in Spanish. The song also ended up becoming a top forty hit in Canada, peaking at number 35 on the Canadian Hot 100.

Music video
Scenes of the music video are shown with Avila lying in her bed, lying on a couch in her living room, and in a different room with wooden walls. The music video premiered on MTV on April 9.

Chart performance

References

2006 songs
2007 singles
Eva Avila songs
Sony BMG singles
Songs written by Carmen Reece
Songs written by Lindy Robbins